Xeni can refer to:

Xeni Gwet'in, Canadian First Nations people
Xeni Gwet'in First Nation, their government
Xeni Jardin, American journalist

See also
Zeni (disambiguation)